H. Saifullah Yusuf, better known by his nickname Gus Ipul, is an Indonesian politician and former Vice Governor of East Java.

Education
Gus Ipul holds a master's degree in Social and Politics Study Faculty from National University in Jakarta.

Career
Gus Ipul started his political career through GP Ansor, the youth wing of Nahdlatul Ulama. He served as the Chief of GP Ansor for two terms, from 2000-2005 and 2005-2010. He assumed the office of Deputy Governor of East Java on 12 February 2009.

References 
 KUNJUNGAN KERJA WAKIL GUBERNUR JAWA TIMUR Drs. H. SAIFULLAH YUSUF

Living people
1964 births
Vice Governors of East Java
People from Pasuruan
National Awakening Party politicians